Daniel Eriksson (born 20 October 1974) is a Swedish retired bandy player.

Career

Club career
Eriksson is a youth product of Sandviken and has represented their senior team, Vodnik and Dynamo Moscow.

International career
Eriksson has played for the Swedish national bandy team making his debut in the 2000–01 season. Eriksson was part of Swedish World Champions teams of 2003 and 2005

Honours

Country
 Sweden
 Bandy World Championship: 2003, 2005

References

External links
 
 

1974 births
Living people
Swedish bandy players
Expatriate bandy players in Russia
Swedish expatriate sportspeople in Russia
Sandvikens AIK players
Vodnik Arkhangelsk players
Dynamo Kazan players
Sweden international bandy players
Bandy World Championship-winning players